Wielenbach is a municipality  in the Weilheim-Schongau district, in Bavaria, Germany.

References 

Weilheim-Schongau